Camp Rock is a summit in Wise and Scott counties, Virginia, in the United States.

Camp Rock was named from a campsite at a cliff used by pioneers.

References

Landforms of Scott County, Virginia
Landforms of Wise County, Virginia
Mountains of Virginia